The Aston Martin AMR23 is a Formula One racing car designed and developed by the Aston Martin F1 team competing in the 2023 Formula One World Championship. It is the third Formula One car entered by Aston Martin in the 21st century, and is driven by Lance Stroll and Fernando Alonso. Aston Martin reserve driver Felipe Drugovich temporarily replaced Stroll for all three days of the pre-season test in Bahrain, after the latter had a cycling incident that forced him to withdraw from the test.

Design and development
On 16 December 2022, Aston Martin announced that they would launch the AMR23 on 13 February 2023 making them the first constructor to announce their launch date.

Competition history
The AMR23 immediately proved to be far more competitive than its predecessor, as the Aston Martin team were able to pick up 23 points from the opening round in Bahrain, with Fernando Alonso scoring the team's second ever podium finish in third place, and Lance Stroll finishing in sixth place, despite the two teammates colliding at turn four on the first lap. In the closing stages of the race, Alonso was running in sixth position, but he managed to overtake Lewis Hamilton and Carlos Sainz Jr. on-track, and combined with Charles Leclerc's retirement on lap 41, this allowed Alonso to secure third place. The following race at the 2023 Saudi Arabian Grand Prix marked Aston Martin's first retirement with Lance Stroll retiring on lap 16 due to engine issues; however, Alonso, having served a penalty earlier on for lining up on the wrong grid position after the formation lap, remained competitive, placing third once again behind the Red Bulls of Max Verstappen and Sergio Pérez and taking his 100th podium in his Formula One career - being the sixth driver in the sport's history to do so.

Complete Formula One results
(key)

* Season still in progress.

References

External links 
 

AMR22